Air Transport World (ATW) is an online and print trade publication  covering the global air transportation industry. It is owned by Informa and is a sister publication to Aviation Week, the Aviation Daily and MRO Digest, which are all part of the Aviation Week Network Group. ATW, as it is commonly referred to, was founded in 1964 by Joseph S. Murphy, its first Editor-in-Chief. It is based in Washington, D.C., and publishes a news website, a daily e-newsletter, the ATW Daily News, a print magazine, editor blogs and editorials, the annual World Airline Report, numerous annual industry reports and surveys, and the annual ATW Airline Industry Achievement Awards.

Air Transport World
The publication tracks and analyzes global airline operations, market conditions, the regulatory and environment developments, government affairs, global alliances, airline ticket distribution, management strategy, financials, airports and routes, aircraft and engines, the supply chain and related issues. 
Editors select the winners of the annual ATW Airline Industry Achievement Awards based on nominees' operational and financial performance, customer service, safety record, innovation, labor relations and executive leadership. 
The publication is known for its editorials and stances on commercial aviation issues such as liberalization, safe operations of unmanned aerial vehicles in commercial airspace, common sense consumer regulation, fair trade practices for airlines, and fair government fees and taxes on airlines.
The current Editor-in-Chief, Karen Walker, joined the publication in 2011. Previous chief editors include Perry Flint and J.A. Donoghue.

References

Aviation magazines
Magazines established in 1964
Magazines published in Washington, D.C.
Monthly magazines published in the United States
Professional and trade magazines
Transport magazines published in the United States